Dil Mera Dhadkan Teri is 2013 Pakistani romantic drama telefilm directed by Mehreen Jabbar. Film is a remake of the same name released in 1968, starred by Waheed Murad and Rani. The film is produced by Humayun Saeed and Tarang Housefull. Film stars Sanam Saeed, Ahsan Khan and Sarwat Gilani.

Cast 
 Ahsan Khan as Saad
 Sarwat Gilani as Saira
 Sanam Saeed as Beenish
 Zeenat Yasmin
 Zahin Tahira (Cameo)
 Manzoor Qureshi (Cameo)

Soundtrack 

Dil Mera Dhadkan Teri songs are sung by Rahat Fateh Ali Khan and Shaan.

References 

2010s Urdu-language films
Pakistani romantic drama films
Pakistani television films
Lollywood films
2013 films
Remakes of Pakistani films
Mehreen Jabbar's directions
Six Sigma Plus
Geo Films films
2013 romantic drama films